Paul Campbell Robertson Bayvel (28 March 1949 – 14 April 2020) was a South African rugby union player who played for the national team as a scrum-half.

Playing career
Bayvel made his provincial debut for Transvaal in 1972 and in the same year toured with the Gazelles, a South African under 24 team, to Argentina. During the tour, the Gazelles played two matches against the Argentine national team, which are considered test matches for Argentina. Bayvel played in the first of these matches which was won 14–6 by the Gazelles.

He made his test debut for the Springboks on 22 June 1974 at Loftus Versfeld in Pretoria in the second test against the touring British Lions team, in partnership with his provincial flyhalf, Gerald Bosch. Bayvel was injured before the third test but returned to the side for the drawn fourth and final test at his home ground, Ellis Park in Johannesburg. During November 1974, Bayvel toured with the Springboks to France and played in both tests as well as in three tour matches.

In 1975 France toured South Africa, playing eleven matches that include two test matches.  Bayvel played in both tests against France and during the 1976 New Zealand tour of South Africa, he played in all four test against the All Blacks.

Test history

Accolades
In 1972, Bayvel was one of the five Young Players of the Year, along with Gerald Bosch, Pikkie du Toit, Dugald MacDonald and Jackie Snyman.

See also
List of South Africa national rugby union players – Springbok no. 468

References

2020 deaths
South African rugby union players
1949 births
Alumni of Parktown Boys' High School
Golden Lions players
South Africa international rugby union players
White South African people
Rugby union players from Johannesburg
Rugby union scrum-halves